The 1983 Labatt Brier, Canada's national men's curling championship, was held from March 6 to 13 at the Sudbury Arena in Sudbury, Ontario.

The "Dream Team" of Ed Werenich, Paul Savage, John Kawaja and Neil Harrison representing Ontario won the event, defeating Ed Lukowich's Alberta rink in the final.

The 1983 Brier was the first to use wireless microphones on the players, so that CBC viewers at home could listen to the player's strategies. This meant for some amusing remarks made by some of the more colourful curlers being heard across the country. The semi-final between Ontario and British Columbia's Bernie Sparkes rink is regarded as being one of the greatest curling games in Brier history, as Werenich had to make numerous double- and triple-takeouts in the game.

Teams

Round robin standings

Round robin results

Draw 1

Draw 2

Draw 3

Draw 4

Draw 5

Draw 6

Draw 7

Draw 8

Draw 9

Draw 10

Draw 11

Draw 12

Draw 13

Draw 14

Draw 15

Playoffs

Semifinal

Final

References

Archived Statistical Summary

1983
1983 in Canadian curling
Curling competitions in Greater Sudbury
1983 in Ontario
March 1983 sports events in Canada